Arangu may refer to:
 Arangu-ye Bala
 Arangu-ye Pain
 Arangu (film), a 1991 film